"Broken Tonight" is a song by Dutch disc jockey and record producer Armin van Buuren. It features vocals and lyrics from Dutch singer and songwriter VanVelzen. The song was released in the Netherlands by Armind on 26 October 2009 as the second single from VanVelzen's third studio album Hear Me Out.

Music video 
A music video to accompany the release of "Broken Tonight" was first released onto YouTube on 17 December 2009. It was directed by Jelle Posthuma. The music video was shot in London. It shows the story of a depressive woman who gets back to live thanks to VanVelzen's spirit.

Track listing 
 Netherlands – Armind – digital download 
 "Broken Tonight" (extended mix) – 6:04
 "Broken Tonight" (dub mix) – 6:03

 Netherlands – Armada – digital download & CD 
 "Broken Tonight" (radio edit) – 2:58
 "Broken Tonight" (original mix) – 6:04
 "Broken Tonight" (dub mix) – 6:03

 Netherlands – Armind – digital download - remixes 
 "Broken Tonight" (Alex M.O.R.P.H. remix) – 9:07
 "Broken Tonight" (Hardwell remix) – 7:02
 "Broken Tonight" (Hardwell Dutch club mix) – 5:04

Charts

References 

2009 singles
Armin van Buuren songs
2009 songs
Armada Music singles
Songs written by Carl Falk
Songs written by Didrik Thott